"Coming Home" is a song by English rock band Kaiser Chiefs. The song was released as the lead single from their fifth studio album, Education, Education, Education & War (2014). It was released in the United Kingdom on 13 February 2014 as a digital download. The song peaked at number 31 on the UK Singles Chart, and is the first Kaiser Chiefs single to reach the UK Top 40 since "Never Miss a Beat" in 2008.

Music video
A music video to accompany the release of "Coming Home" was first released onto YouTube on 19 February 2014 at a total length of four minutes and forty-two seconds. The video was shot on the moor above the village of Blubberhouses, in the Yorkshire Dales, England.

Track listing

Charts

References

2014 singles
Kaiser Chiefs songs
2014 songs
Songs written by Ricky Wilson (British musician)
Fiction Records singles
Universal Music Group singles
Caroline Records singles
Songs written by Nick "Peanut" Baines
Songs written by Simon Rix
Songs written by Andrew White (musician)